Xorides praecatorius is a parasitoid wasp from ichneumonid family that parasitizes many long-horned beetles of the following species: Tetropium castaneum,  Tetropium fuscum, Aromia moschata, Callidium aeneum  Callidium violaceum, and some other.

References

Xoridinae
Insects described in 1793